"I Decided" is a song by American recording artist Solange Knowles. It was written and composed by Knowles and producer Pharrell Williams for her second studio album Sol-Angel and the Hadley St. Dreams (2008). The song samples hand-claps of the 1964 recording "Where Did Our Love Go", as performed by The Supremes, and is also based on the melody of "(Love Is Like a) Heat Wave" (1963) by Martha and the Vandellas. It was released as the album's leading single as a digital download to both iTunes and Amazon on April 22, 2008 (see 2008 in music), and was impacted to rhythmic/crossover radio stations on June 24, 2008.

A remix version of the song, entitled "I Decided (Part 2)", produced by British band Freemasons was released as the first single in Europe, where the song entered the top 30 of the UK Singles Chart. The track reached the number-one spot on the US Billboard Hot Singles Sales, Hot R&B/Hip-Hop Singles Sales, Hot Dance Singles Sales and Hot Dance Club Play charts.

Music video
  
The video was shot in April 2008 and directed by Melina Matsoukas and Solange as it shows pop culture imagery from the 1960s, shows the 1970s, then 1980s to the future. It displays Solange in settings from American Bandstand, to the Civil Rights Movement, to Soul Train, to MTV, and finally a "Cosmic Journey" future. It is set in a pop art form. As of January 15, 2018, on YouTube the original version has been watched more than 4,190,000 times. The shortened video for "I Decided, Pt. 2" has been watched more than 423,000 times.

The video debuted at #4 on MTV's TRL. On BET J it appeared at #17 on the year-end Last Call 2008! Top 50 Countdown.

Chart performance
The song debuted on the Billboard Hot R&B/Hip-Hop Songs chart at number 44 in the Billboard issue dated July 5, 2008. The song also debuted at number one on the Hot Dance Singles Sales and Hot R&B/Hip-Hop Singles Sales charts and debuted at number two on the Hot Singles Sales chart.

In the United Kingdom, the song debuted at number 6 on R&B Singles Chart on August 17, 2008. In its second and third weeks the song fell to numbers 7, and 9. In its fourth and fifth weeks the song fell to number 12 and number 14. In its sixth week the song fell to number 18 and became a non-mover until falling in its eighth week to number 22. In its ninth week the song dropped to number 32. The song spent a total of 10 weeks on the UK R&B Singles Chart before leaving the chart on October 19, 2008 charting finally at number 36.

The song debuted at 27 on the UK Singles Chart. The song spent a total of four weeks on the UK Singles Chart, charting at numbers 32, 58 and 95 in its second, third, and fourth weeks. The song sold 20,000 in UK.

Track listing and formats

 Digital Download
 "I Decided" - 4:16

 Pt. 1 Instrumental Version
 "I Decided, Pt. 1" (Instrumental) - 4:17

 Pt. 2 Instrumental Version
 "I Decided, Pt. 2" ((Freemasons Remix) [Instrumental]) - 4:02

 Remixes - EP
 "I Decided" (Freemasons Radio) - 3:48
 "I Decided" (Moto Blanco Edit) - 3:39
 "I Decided" (Mr. Mig Radio) - 4:44
 "I Decided" (Azza Extended) - 4:55

 King Britt FiveSix Mix Single
 "I Decided" (King Britt FiveSix Mix) - 7:01

Charts

Release history

References

External links
 SolangeMusic.com  — official site

2008 singles
Solange Knowles songs
Song recordings produced by the Neptunes
Music videos directed by Melina Matsoukas
Songs written by Pharrell Williams
Songs written by Solange Knowles
2008 songs